Ibn al-ʿAmīd may refer to:

two Buyid viziers, father and son:
Abu'l-Fadl ibn al-Amid (died 970)
Abu'l-Fath Ali ibn Muhammad ibn al-Amid (died 977)

members of the Coptic Banū al-ʿAmīd family:
Al-Makīn Jirjis ibn al-ʿAmīd the Elder (died 1273), historian
Al-Makīn Jirjis ibn al-ʿAmīd the Younger (died after 1398), theologian